Au chien qui fume is a traditional French restaurant located in the 1st arrondissement of Paris, France. It is listed as a Historic Monument.

Location
The restaurant is located at 33 Rue du Pont-Neuf, close to the Métro stations Louvre - Rivoli (Line 1) and Les Halles (Line 4).

History
The Rue du Pont-Neuf was built in the second half of the 19th century, as well as the building at No. 33. A café was opened on the ground floor.

Description
In the front window, four signs show smoking dogs and extensive text. The inner room features wooden counters adorned with dog heads.

See also
List of monuments historiques in Paris

References

External links

Official website 

Restaurants in Paris
French restaurants
Buildings and structures in the 1st arrondissement of Paris
19th-century establishments in France
Monuments historiques of Paris